Moira Foot (born in Northampton) on 19 June 1953 is an English actress.  She starred in 'Allo 'Allo!,. playing Denise Laroque, the leader of the local communist resistance.  She also played Miss Thorpe, Mr Rumbold's temporary secretary, in three episodes of Are You Being Served?.  Other series in which she appeared include Hark at Barker, Six Dates with Barker, His Lordship Entertains, On the Buses, Oh Happy Band!, Maggie and Her, Doctor at Large, Quiller, and The Benny Hill Show. In 1977 she appeared in the episode Angels of Death in The New Avengers. Her film credits include roles in One Brief Summer (1970), On the Buses (1971), and The Strange Case of the End of Civilization as We Know It (1977).

Moira Foot is the daughter of Alistair Foot, co-writer (with Anthony Marriott) of the long-running farce No Sex Please, We're British.

Filmography 
 'Allo 'Allo
 Oh Happy Band
 The Dick Emery Show
 Maggie and Her
 The Strange Case of the End of Civilization as We Know It
 The New Avengers
 The Benny Hill Show
 Quiller (TV Series) 
 Whodunnit? (TV Series)
 Are You Being Served? (TV Series) 
 The Life of Riley (TV Series) 
 Late Night Drama (TV Series) 
 Men of Affairs (TV Series) 
 Billy Liar (TV Series) 
 His Lordship Entertains (TV Series) 
 Bachelor Father (TV Series) 
 On the Buses
 Doctor at Large (TV Series) 
 Six Dates with Barker (TV Series) 
 Hark at Barker (TV Series) 
 One Brief Summer

References

External links

Living people
English television actresses
People from Northampton
Actors from Northamptonshire
20th-century English actresses